Sens is a town and commune in France.

Sens or SENS may also refer to:
Strategies for engineered negligible senescence, a regenerative medicine proposal
SENS Research Foundation, a non-profit science organization
Daewoo Sens, a Ukrainian version of the Daewoo Lanos automobile
Ottawa Senators, a team in the National Hockey League
S.E.N.S., a Japanese instrumental group
Samsung Sens, a series of laptop computers
Saudi Environmental Society
System Event Notification Service in the Microsoft Windows operating system